Kai Frandsen (15 May 1924 – 18 March 2013) was a Danish footballer. He played in five matches for the Denmark national football team from 1949 to 1950.

References

External links
 

1924 births
2013 deaths
Danish men's footballers
Denmark international footballers
Place of birth missing
Association footballers not categorized by position